Josef Drásal (4 July 1841 – 16 December 1886) is the tallest Czech who ever lived and one of the tallest people of the world.

Life
Drásal was born in Chromeč, into a poor family as the third of six children. At an early age, he differed from his peers and reportedly suffered from the pain they attributed to his abnormally rapid growth. Growth pain probably affected his mental development. He had great strength, but despite graduating from elementary school, he did not learn to read and write properly.

Drásal was considered a good and gentle man. After school he started working as a day laborer in his native village and then as a coachman in Bludov Chateau. In 1860 he went to the town of Holešov to work as an agricultural worker.

In Holešov, a local innkeeper noticed him and turned him into a circus attraction. He became known as "Hanakian Giant" and performed in the traditional costume typical of this ethnographic region. He travelled all over Europe with his performance, most notable were his performances for emperors Napoleon III and Wilhelm II. His circus career earned him his own house in Holešov, where he lived until his death. Nothing has been preserved from the building modifications adapting the house to his height.

Drásal died in Holešov at the age of 45 from an unknown disease, probably related to his lifestyle and frequent travel.

Height

Drásal's height was caused by acromegaly disease. No evidence of his height has been preserved, but a copy of his skeleton is stored in the Department of Anatomy, Faculty of Medicine, Masaryk University in Brno.

Honours and legacy
Drásal's name bears the prestigious and most difficult Czech cross-country cycling race named Bikemaraton Drásal, which takes place every year in Holešov.

A street in Holešov is named after Drásal.

A permanent exhibition on Josef Drásal has been in the Regional Museum in Olomouc since 2015. It includes his unique costume.

See also
List of tallest people

References

1841 births
1886 deaths
People from Šumperk District
People with gigantism